The 1952 Cal Aggies football team represented the College of Agriculture at Davis—now known as the University of California, Davis—as a member of the Far Western Conference (FWC) during the 1952 college football season. Led by fourth-year head coach Ted Forbes, the Aggies compiled an overall record of 2–7 with a mark of 2–1 in conference play, placing second in the FWC. The team was outscored by its opponents 263 to 112 for the season. The Cal Aggies played home games at Aggie Field in Davis, California.

Schedule

Notes

References

Cal Aggies
UC Davis Aggies football seasons
Cal Aggies football